The Darien Times is a weekly newspaper that focuses on local news of Darien, CT. The paper covers Darien's news, politics, sports, schools, and feature stories. The paper publishes a monthly section on arts and entertainment, as well. It also includes columns from local voices. It is distributed every Thursday. The paper is published by Hersam Acorn Newspapers, a community news and multimedia firm in more than 20 communities in Connecticut, New York, and Vermont. The assistant editor, DesRoches was named the New England Newspaper and Press Association's journalist of the year.

References

Weekly newspapers published in the United States
Newspapers published in Connecticut
Mass media in Fairfield County, Connecticut
Darien, Connecticut